Kenneth A. Simpler is an American politician. He was Delaware State Treasurer from 2015 to 2019. He is the last Republican to win a statewide race in Delaware.

Education
Simpler attended high school at St. Andrew's School in Middletown, Delaware. He earned a Bachelor of Arts in political economy at Princeton University. While in college, he was charged in an incident where 45 students were sent to the Princeton infirmary or local hospital for alcohol-induced medical problems, including one student who was in a coma for 24 hours. He was sentenced to 30 days in jail for his role in hosting parties where alcohol was served to minors.

Simpler earned a Master of Business Administration and a Juris Doctor from the University of Chicago. He was owner and chief financial officer of Seaboard Hotels and managing director at Citadel LLC. He worked as a corporate attorney at Kirkland & Ellis and has served on the board of directors of Draper Holdings, the parent company of WBOC and Fox 21.

While serving as Delaware State Treasurer, Simpler enrolled at the Joseph R. Biden, Jr. School of Public Policy & Administration at the University of Delaware to pursue a Master of Public Administration. After leaving office, he completed the degree in February 2020.

Political career
Simpler was elected Delaware State Treasurer on November 4, 2014, and took office on January 6, 2015. In the 2018 elections, he was defeated in his reelection campaign by Democrat Colleen Davis. His defeat was one of several losses for prominent Republicans in Delaware in 2018 and as of 2023 establishes him as the most recent Republican to serve statewide.

Electoral history

References

External links
 

21st-century American politicians
Delaware Republicans
People associated with Kirkland & Ellis
Living people
People from Rehoboth Beach, Delaware
Princeton University alumni
State treasurers of Delaware
University of Chicago Booth School of Business alumni
University of Chicago Law School alumni
Year of birth missing (living people)